Colwyn Bay Community Hospital is a community hospital in Colwyn Bay, Wales. It is managed by the Betsi Cadwaladr University Health Board.

History
The hospital has its origins in the Colwyn Bay Jubilee Cottage Hospital which was established in 1899  which was built on land donated by Winifred, Countess of Dundonald.

On 14 December 1910, Winifred, Countess of Dundonald was invited to open a new operating theatre.

The present hospital, which was designed by Sidney Colwyn Foulkes and incorporated the latest concepts from the United States, opened as the Colwyn Bay and West Denbighshire Hospital in 1925. It joined the National Health Service in 1948 and became a community hospital in the 1980s.

References

Hospitals established in 1899
Hospitals in Conwy County Borough
Hospital buildings completed in 1925
1899 establishments in Wales
NHS hospitals in Wales
Betsi Cadwaladr University Health Board
Colwyn Bay